Tanamá may refer to:

Places
Tanamá, Adjuntas, Puerto Rico, a barrio
Tanamá, Arecibo, Puerto Rico, a barrio